The 2017 San Diego State Aztecs football team represented San Diego State University in the 2017 NCAA Division I FBS football season. The Aztecs were led by seventh-year head coach Rocky Long and played their home games at SDCCU Stadium. SDSU is a member of the Mountain West Conference in the West Division. They finished the season 10–3, 6–2 in Mountain West play to finish in second place in the West Division. They were invited to the Armed Forces Bowl where they lost to Army.

Personnel

Position key

Recruiting class 

The Aztecs signed a total of 23 recruits.

Schedule 

Schedule Source: 2017 San Diego State Aztecs football schedule

Rankings

Game summaries

UC Davis

at Arizona State

Stanford

at Air Force

Northern Illinois

at UNLV

Boise State

Fresno State

at Hawaii

at San Jose State

Nevada

New Mexico

vs Army–Armed Forces Bowl

Players in the 2018 NFL Draft

References

San Diego State
San Diego State Aztecs football seasons
San Diego State Aztecs football